The Pseudomugilidae, the blue-eyes, are a subfamily of atheriniform fish in the rainbowfish family Melanotaeniidae. They inhabit fresh and brackish water in Australia, New Guinea and nearby smaller islands. Like the larger Melanotaeniid rainbowfish, they spawn all year round, and attach their eggs to vegetation.

Genera
There are three general in the Pseudomugilinae:

 Kiunga G. R. Allen, 1983
 Pseudomugil Kner, 1866
 Scaturiginichthys Ivantsoff, Unmack, Saeed & Crowley, 1991

References

 
Melanotaeniidae